Two vessels have borne the name HMS Heureux, both of them captured from the French. The name translates as happy.

The first  was the French 22-gun privateer brig Heureux that  captured in 1800. She was taken into service and apparently foundered in 1806.
The second  was a 16-gun French brig that  captured in 1807; she was sold in 1814.

Royal Navy ship names